Sturba is a river in Western Bosnia and Herzegovina, and flows through Livanjsko Polje near Livno in Bosnia and Herzegovina.

References

Rivers of Bosnia and Herzegovina
Buško Blato basin
Livanjsko polje